The Hunger Games: Catching Fire is a 2013 American dystopian science fiction action film directed by Francis Lawrence from a screenplay by Simon Beaufoy and Michael Arndt (credited as Michael deBruyn), based on the 2009 novel Catching Fire by Suzanne Collins. The sequel to The Hunger Games (2012), it is the second installment in The Hunger Games film series. Jennifer Lawrence, Josh Hutcherson, Liam Hemsworth, Woody Harrelson, Elizabeth Banks, Lenny Kravitz, Stanley Tucci, and Donald Sutherland reprise their roles from the previous film while Philip Seymour Hoffman, Jeffrey Wright, Sam Claflin, Lynn Cohen, Jena Malone, and Amanda Plummer join as new characters. The plot of Catching Fire begins a few months after the previous installment; Katniss Everdeen (Jennifer Lawrence) and fellow District 12 tribute Peeta Mellark (Hutcherson) have returned home safely after winning the 74th Annual Hunger Games. Throughout the story, Katniss senses that a rebellion against the oppressive Capitol is simmering among the districts.

Filming took place from September 2012 to March 2013 in Georgia, Hawaii, and New Jersey. The Hunger Games: Catching Fire premiered in London on November 11, 2013 and was theatrically released on November 15, 2013, in Brazil; November 20, in Finland, Sweden, and Norway; November 21, in the United Kingdom; and November 22, in the United States. The film set records for the biggest November opening weekend and biggest three- and five-day Thanksgiving box-office totals, surpassing the first film's box office grosses by over $150 million. It ranks as the 30th-highest-grossing film at the domestic box office and the highest-grossing film at the domestic box office of 2013, becoming the first 2D film since The Dark Knight (2008) to top the yearly box office, as well as having a lead female actor top the box office for the first time since The Exorcist (1973). The film has grossed over $865 million worldwide and is the fifth-highest-grossing film of 2013, the highest-grossing film released by Lionsgate, and the highest-grossing entry in The Hunger Games series.

Catching Fire received positive reviews and is considered by critics to be an improvement over its predecessor, with the sentiment being that it's "a more-confident, more-polished movie"; and praised Lawrence's performance as Katniss, themes, action sequences, musical score, screenplay, visual effects and emotional depth. It was the most critically acclaimed chapter in The Hunger Games series, according to review aggregator Rotten Tomatoes. The film also received numerous nominations, with a nomination for the Broadcast Film Critics Association Award for Best Action Film and a Saturn Award for Best Science Fiction Film. For her performance, Lawrence was nominated a second time for the Empire Award for Best Actress as well as the Saturn Award and Broadcast Film Critics Association Award. The song "Atlas" was also nominated for the Grammy Award for Best Song Written for Visual Media and a Golden Globe Award for Best Original Song.

The film was followed by The Hunger Games: Mockingjay – Part 1 and The Hunger Games: Mockingjay – Part 2 in 2014 and 2015, respectively.

Plot

Katniss Everdeen and Peeta Mellark have settled into a life of material comfort and emotional unease back in District 12 following their joint victory in the 74th Hunger Games. President Snow visits Katniss and explains that her actions in the Games — specifically, her would-be suicide pact with Peeta — have inspired uprisings across Panem. He orders her to use the upcoming Victory Tour to convince him that her actions were out of love and not defiance against the Capitol, warning her that her friends, family, and everyone else in District 12 will otherwise face execution. Katniss' mentor, Haymitch, later warns her that Victors of the games must serve as mentors to future tributes and that their show of love will be forced to continue for the rest of their lives.

Unrest and protests are on display in many Districts over the course of the Victory Tour, as is brutality by local Peacekeepers. Peeta and Katniss subsequently announce their engagement in an attempt to quell the Districts. At an upper-class party concluding the tour, Snow publicly toasts them but subtly signals to Katniss that he remains unconvinced. During the festivities, Katniss meets enigmatic new head Gamemaker Plutarch Heavensbee. Peacekeepers led by the brutal Commander Romulus Thread begin to mercilessly raid homes and other places throughout District 12, placing the citizens under curfew. Katniss's friend Gale is publicly whipped after tackling Thread to stop him from killing civilians; he is saved by Katniss and the other victors. Heavensbee tells Snow that the rebellion cannot survive Katniss’ new celebrity status as a victor.

The upcoming 75th Hunger Games - the third "Quarter Quell" — is announced, with tributes set to be selected from previous victors. Katniss devotes herself to ensuring Peeta survives. On Reaping Day, Haymitch's name is drawn, but Peeta immediately volunteers to take his place. The adult tributes, accustomed to a safe and comfortable life as victors, are openly angry about being forced to return to the Games. For her pre-Games interview, Katniss wears a wedding dress, as ordered by Snow, but her stylist Cinna sets it to transform into a symbol of a mockingjay. As an effort to stop the games, Peeta lies during his interview, saying that he and Katniss have married in secret and are expecting a child, which leads to fruitless protests from citizens for the Games to be stopped. Just before Katniss enters the arena, Cinna is beaten to death by Peacekeepers in front of her as punishment for tampering with her dress.

In the Games, Katniss and Peeta ally themselves with the District 4 tributes, playboy Finnick Odair and his elderly mentor Mags. When the arena's forcefield shocks Peeta, stopping his heart, Finnick resuscitates him. The group is later forced to flee from a poisonous fog; when Peeta cannot go on, Mags sacrifices herself so that Finnick can help him. The group discovers that water removes the gas-induced blisters. When mandrills attack, Peeta is saved by the unexpected sacrifice of a drug-addicted tribute from District 6. The group escapes to the beach, where they meet up with Beetee and Wiress, a pair of scientist tributes from District 3, and acerbic District 7 tribute Johanna Mason. Wiress, who has suffered a nervous breakdown, repeats the phrase "tick-tock", leading Katniss to realize that the arena is designed like a clock, with regular hazards each hour contained within their respective zones. Wiress's throat is slit by Gloss, one of the Careers from District 1. Gloss is then fatally shot by Katniss while Johanna kills his sister, Cashmere. Finnick is injured by another Career. Heavensbee has the Gamemakers spin the clock to disorient the tributes.

Beetee suggests luring the rest of the Careers to the wet beach and electrocuting them, taking advantage of the lightning that strikes every 12 hours. The group separates to prepare the trap, laying down wire. When District 2 tributes Brutus and Enobaria emerge, Johanna stuns Katniss, cuts the tracker out of her arm and flees. Katniss finds an unconscious Beetee. Unable to find Peeta, and hearing a cannon, Katniss almost kills Finnick, thinking he betrayed them, but he reminds her to "remember who the real enemy is". Katniss attaches wire to an arrow and shoots it into the arena roof just as lightning strikes. The lightning is conducted along the wire, causing the arena shields to fail and the roof to fall, and Katniss is knocked unconscious.

Katniss awakens in an aircraft with Haymitch, Finnick, a still-unconscious Beetee, and Heavensbee, who is revealed to be a rebel against Snow. Haymitch tells her they are bound for District 13, headquarters of the new rebellion. He reveals that half the tributes were in on a plan to rescue Katniss, a symbol of the growing rebellion, but that Peeta and Johanna have been captured. They thought it would have been better for her not to know. A distraught Katniss is sedated after attempting to attack Haymitch for violating his promise to save Peeta. She awakens to find Gale by her side, who reassures her that her family is safe but her home no longer exists. Gale reveals to her that after the games, The Capital bombed District 12.

Cast
 

 Jennifer Lawrence as Katniss Everdeen
 Josh Hutcherson as Peeta Mellark
 Liam Hemsworth as Gale Hawthorne
 Woody Harrelson as Haymitch Abernathy
 Elizabeth Banks as Effie Trinket
 Lenny Kravitz as Cinna
 Philip Seymour Hoffman as Plutarch Heavensbee
 Jeffrey Wright as Beetee Latier
 Stanley Tucci as Caesar Flickerman
 Donald Sutherland as President Coriolanus Snow
 Toby Jones as Claudius Templesmith
 Willow Shields as Primrose Everdeen
 Sam Claflin as Finnick Odair
 Lynn Cohen as Mags Flanagan
 Jena Malone as Johanna Mason
 Amanda Plummer as Wiress
 Meta Golding as Enobaria
 Bruno Gunn as Brutus
 Alan Ritchson as Gloss
 Stephanie Leigh Schlund as Cashmere
 Patrick St. Esprit as Romulus Thread
 Paula Malcomson as Mrs. Everdeen
 Stef Dawson as Annie Cresta
 Nelson Ascencio as Flavius
 Bruce Bundy as Octavia
 William Tokarsky as Someone Else

Production

Pre-production
Lionsgate announced that a film adaptation of Catching Fire would be released as The Hunger Games: Catching Fire on November 22, 2013, as a sequel to the film adaptation of The Hunger Games, with principal photography to take place in September 2012. Simon Beaufoy was hired to write the script for the film and wrote two drafts before leaving after Gary Ross, director of The Hunger Games decided not to direct the sequel. The shooting timeframe was co-ordinated between Lionsgate and 20th Century Fox, in order to allow time for Jennifer Lawrence to shoot X-Men: Days of Future Past, the sequel to Fox's X-Men: First Class, in January 2013.

On April 10, 2012, it was announced that Gary Ross, director of The Hunger Games, would not return due to a 'tight' and 'fitted' schedule. Ross cited the lack of time he had for directing and writing the film in the three and a half months after the release of the first film as the reason for leaving the franchise, hence his decision to move on to direct Free State of Jones. Bennett Miller, Joe Cornish, Francis Lawrence and Juan Antonio Bayona were all being considered to direct the new film. On April 19, 2012, it was announced that Francis Lawrence was offered the director position for the film. Lionsgate officially announced Francis Lawrence as the director for Catching Fire on May 3, 2012. Two days later, it was reported that Michael Arndt (Toy Story 3, Little Miss Sunshine) was in talks to re-write the script for Catching Fire. On May 24, 2012, the film was renamed The Hunger Games: Catching Fire and Arndt was confirmed as the new writer of the script. Arndt was paid $400,000 a week for re-writing the script.

According to sources, the adaptation needed to be done filming by December 2012 to fit Jennifer Lawrence's schedule. When X-Men: Days of Future Past lost its original director and shooting for the film was delayed till April 2013, Jennifer Lawrence was no longer needed to be filming in January 2013 and the shooting timeframe for The Hunger Games: Catching Fire was extended to March (including several breaks due to the holidays and awards season). The film featured sequences filmed in the IMAX format.

Casting
In July 2012, it was announced that Jena Malone would portray Johanna Mason, that Amanda Plummer would portray Wiress, and that Philip Seymour Hoffman would portray Plutarch Heavensbee. Following this, in August 2012, it was announced that Lynn Cohen had been cast as Mags. Alan Ritchson was cast as Gloss on August 9, Sam Claflin as Finnick Odair on August 22, and Jeffrey Wright as Beetee on September 7.

Filming
Lawrence, Hutcherson and Hemsworth all dyed their hair for the movie once again. Lawrence went back into archery training in order to get in shape for the role while the supporting cast undertook training in preparation for the arena scenes.

Production officially began on September 10, 2012, with shooting concluding for some of the cast on December 21, 2012. After the Christmas break, filming resumed for two weeks in mid January for some of the main cast and was placed on hold for awards season. Principal photography resumed and concluded in March 2013. Shooting first took place in and around metropolitan Atlanta, Georgia and then moved to Hawaii, to shoot the arena scenes. The cast and crew were on a busy schedule, working 14-hour days and six days a week. In an interview with MTV, Josh Hutcherson confirmed scenes in the film would use IMAX cameras by stating, "They're shooting, I think, all the stuff in the arena is going to be IMAX". Jennifer Lawrence and Liam Hemsworth were in Ringwood, New Jersey shooting District 12 scenes involving snow for the beginning of the film on January 31 and February 1. Jennifer Lawrence confirmed that she would fly out to Hawaii on February 25, the day after she won the Academy Award for Best Actress at the 85th Academy Awards to shoot for the final 9 days along with Claflin and Hutcherson.

In late March, filming occurred in the Universal Studios backlot and was kept extremely secretive. Witnesses reported towers and fences on set. None of the main cast were believed to have been on set. Reshoots were scheduled for April 13 in Atlanta. With the base camp set up at Executive Park off North Druid Hills Road, filming also occurred at the Goat Farm Arts Center.

Francis Lawrence has estimated an hour of the film would be devoted to Arena scenes, and said that cameras would be mounted to avoid the shaky-cam look from the first film. In an IMAX featurette, Francis Lawrence also confirmed that scenes taking place in the Arena were shot on IMAX cameras to distinguish them from scenes external to the Arena. Approximately 50 minutes of the film's footage was shot in the IMAX format, through the use of three IMAX 15 perf/65mm film cameras.

Costumes
Sarah Burton, creative director at Alexander McQueen, gave pieces of McQueen's collection to costume designer Trish Summerville. Summerville collaborated with Indonesian designer Tex Saverio when designing Katniss' wedding dress for the Quarter Quell interviews.

Music

Soundtrack

British singer Ed Sheeran recorded three songs for the soundtrack, but Lionsgate declined the offer. On May 14, 2013, Alexandra Patsavas was listed in the credits as music supervisor, replacing T Bone Burnett from the first film. Coldplay were announced as the first official artist to be featured on the Catching Fire soundtrack album, with the song "Atlas", released worldwide on September 6, 2013. Christina Aguilera announced that her song, "We Remain", would be part of the official soundtrack of the film. Other artists featured on the soundtrack include Of Monsters and Men with "Silhouettes", Sia featuring The Weeknd & Diplo with "Elastic Heart", The National with "Lean", The Weeknd with "Devil May Cry", Imagine Dragons with "Who We Are", Lorde with "Everybody Wants to Rule the World", The Lumineers with "Gale Song", Ellie Goulding with "Mirror", Patti Smith with "Capitol Letter", Santigold with "Shooting Arrows at the Sky", Mikky Ekko with "Place for Us", Phantogram with "Lights", and Antony and the Johnsons with "Angel on Fire".<ref>{{cite web|title=The Hunger Games: Catching Fire' Soundtrack Goes Global, as Lionsgate and Republic Records Add Local All-Star Artists for Albums Sold in Select International Territories|url=http://www.lionsgate.com/corporate/press-releases/1551/|publisher=Lionsgate|access-date=October 16, 2013}}</ref>

Score

 
In October 2012, composer James Newton Howard confirmed that he would return to score the film. The score album was released on November 25, 2013. All songs written and composed by James Newton Howard, except "We're a Team" (co-written by Coldplay band members: Guy Berryman, Jonny Buckland, Will Champion, and Chris Martin).

Release
Marketing
On November 16, 2012, the first teaser trailer was released with The Twilight Saga: Breaking Dawn – Part 2 and revealed the official logo and tagline for the film. Lionsgate announced a sweepstakes competition where 12 fans would have their name listed in the film's credits. On January 11, 2013, Entertainment Weekly released a 2013 Preview edition of their magazine, with the first look of Lawrence as Katniss and Claflin as Finnick on the cover as well as several stills showcasing scenes from the film. On February 22, both Hitfix and the official Facebook page debuted two viral posters of the Victory Tour featuring Jennifer Lawrence (Katniss) and Josh Hutcherson (Peeta).

On January 28, 2013, CapitolCouture.PN, a promotional site for the film's fashion and culture, opened and could only be unlocked with a passcode. Once in, a picture of a blue chair appeared and told readers to check back on March 4. On March 4, 2013, the site began to release portraits of the various characters.

Alongside the announcement of the teaser trailer premiering at the 2013 MTV Movie Awards, Lionsgate revealed a new website called TheHungerGamesExplorer. On April 10, the website was updated and fans had to tweet using the hashtag #HungerGamesExplorer to unlock new stills from the movie. A still could be unlocked every day leading up to April 14, 2013, the teaser trailer's release date.

The teaser trailer thus debuted at the 2013 MTV Movie Awards on April 14, presented by Liam Hemsworth, and the trailer was posted on TheHungerGamesExplorer and YouTube after the ceremony. "Beyond Fire" by T.T.L. was played as the trailer music.

An exclusive new trailer debuted at the San Diego Comic-Con International on July 20, 2013, also being released online on that day. Walmart released the first TV spot on their Facebook page on October 14, featuring Coldplay's song, "Atlas".

On October 27, 2013, during the fifth inning of game 4 of the 2013 World Series, the final trailer was released. Three days later, on October 30, 2013, a new IMAX poster for the film debuted.

Theatrical
The film premiered at the Odeon Leicester Square theater in London on November 11, 2013. The film was later released on November 22, 2013, in the United States in conventional and IMAX theaters. The film was also shown in the 4DX format in selected international territories. It features motion-enhanced seating, wind, water sprays, strobe lightning, and scent-based special effects. The film was released in 4,165 theaters in the United States and Canada alone.

Home media
The Blu-ray/DVD release date for the film in the United States was March 7, 2014. The entire Hunger Games series was released on 4K UHD Blu-ray on November 8, 2016.

Actresses Lynn Cohen and Stephanie Leigh Schlund, who played Mags and Cashmere in the film, respectively, promoted the DVD and Blu-ray versions of the film with an appearance at the March 7, 2014 midnight release of the product at the Walmart in Secaucus, New Jersey. As of March 16, 2014, Catching Fire has sold 2,073,719 DVDs along with 2,186,430 Blu-ray discs for $35.4 million and $43.8 million, respectively, totaling $79.4 million of revenue within two weeks of release.

Reception
Box officeThe Hunger Games: Catching Fire earned $424.7 million in North America and $440.3 million in other countries for a worldwide total of $865 million. Worldwide, it is the highest-grossing film of The Hunger Games series, the highest-grossing film distributed by Lionsgate and the fifth-highest-grossing 2013 film.

Outside North America, it is the highest-grossing film of The Hunger Games series, the highest-grossing film released by Lionsgate and the seventh-highest-grossing 2013 film. On its first weekend, it was only released in Brazil (November 15, 2013), where it grossed $2.4 million on its opening day and $5.26 million for the weekend. On the following Wednesday and Thursday, it opened in 42 more territories, bringing its total to $32 million in a week. The film opened in 63 other territories and earned $138.4 million during the weekend ($146.6 million including its first week in Brazil). Its three largest openings occurred in the UK, Ireland and Malta ($19.8 million), China ($13.0 million) and Germany ($12.9 million). In total earnings, its largest countries are the UK, Ireland and Malta ($55.5 million), Germany ($43.4 million) and Australia ($34.3 million).

In North America, Catching Fire is the 30th-highest-grossing film, the highest-grossing film of The Hunger Games series, the highest-grossing film distributed by Lionsgate and the highest-grossing 2013 film. Box Office Mojo estimates that the film sold more than 50 million tickets in the United States and Canada. It became the first 2-D film since The Dark Knight (2008), as well as the first film with a female lead since The Exorcist (1973), to top the yearly box office. It is also the top-selling film in Fandango history, surpassing previous record-holder Avatar. The film earned $25.3 million during Thursday late-night showings. It topped the box office on its opening day with $71.0 million (including Thursday late-night showings), which is higher than its predecessor's opening-day gross ($67.3 million) and is also the seventh largest single-day and opening-day gross. During its opening weekend, The Hunger Games: Catching Fire claimed first place with $158.1 million, opening higher than its predecessor ($152.5 million). This was the sixth-highest-grossing opening weekend, the second-highest-grossing opening weekend of 2013 behind Iron Man 3 ($174.1 million), and the highest-grossing opening weekend in November, breaking the record set by The Twilight Saga: New Moon ($142.9 million) in 2009. The film held the November weekend record for nine years until it was topped in 2022 by Black Panther: Wakanda Forever ($180 million). It was in first place for two consecutive weekends. The film also broke the following records: the biggest Friday for a film in its second weekend, the largest three-day ($74.2 million) and largest five-day ($109.9 million) Thanksgiving gross. The latter two records would be held until 2019 when they were both surpassed by Frozen II. The film achieved the fifth-highest-grossing opening week (Friday-to-Thursday), the third-highest non-opening Wednesday and the fourth-largest second weekend.

Critical responseThe Hunger Games: Catching Fire received very positive reviews from critics. Review aggregator Rotten Tomatoes gives the film a score of 90% based on reviews from 293 professional critics, with a rating average of 7.6/10. The website's critical consensus reads: "Smart, smoothly directed, and enriched with a deeper exploration of the franchise's thought-provoking themes, Catching Fire proves a thoroughly compelling second installment in the Hunger Games series." It was the highest rated science fiction/fantasy movie of the year on the website. At Metacritic, which assigns a weighted average score out of 100 reviews from mainstream critics, the film received an average score of 76 (indicating "generally favorable reviews") based on 49 reviews. According to polls conducted during the opening weekend by CinemaScore, the average grade audiences gave the film was an A, on an A+ to F scale.The Hollywood Reporter said that the film has received "generally positive reviews" and CNN reported that reviews were "overwhelmingly positive" but noted that "an overarching complaint" was that it "runs needlessly long ... and the screenplay and direction do occasionally fall short." Entertainment Weekly said the consensus was that the sequel is "a more-confident, more-polished movie that delves deeper into Panem's political conflict". It also reported, "Critics are impressed that [Lawrence] commits to Katniss just as much as she would a complex David O. Russell character."

Writing for The Village Voice, Stephanie Zacharek praised Jennifer Lawrence's performance, writing that the actress is "both on fire and in the process of becoming, and it’s magnificent to watch." Peter Travers of Rolling Stone gave the film 3.5 stars out of four and said, "Pop-culture escapism can be thrilling when dished out by experts. Katniss is a character worth a handful of sequels. And Lawrence lights up the screen. You'll follow her anywhere." He also commended supporting actors Sam Claflin and Jena Malone. Reviewing on Roger Ebert's website, Susan Wloszczyna of USA Today awarded the film three out of four stars, praising the acting of Jeffrey Wright, Amanda Plummer and Jena Malone and referring to the challenges of the arena as "visually intriguing." Wloszczyna writes: "...the one truly fresh invention—and the one that matters most—is Katniss herself. With each on-screen chapter, the poor girl from District 12 continues to fulfill her destiny as an inspiration and a rebel fighter." Ian Nathan of Empire gave the film 4 stars out of 5 and noted that it was even better than the first film. He praised director Lawrence for "taking a more muscular approach" and "sensibly downplaying" the love triangle, noting that "neither [Peeta nor Gale], quite frankly, are fit to lay a pinky on [Katniss'] quiver". One fault he did find was in Philip Seymour Hoffman's "surprisingly ineffective performance".

A negative review came from Sophie Monks Kaufman of Little White Lies, who praised Lawrence's performance but criticized the "dilution of the ingredients that made The Hunger Games so gripping." She also found fault with the "lumbering" plot, the "hamminess" of President Snow and Plutarch Heavensbee and the "lackluster and unconvincing script culled from a dramatically difficult book". David Denby of The New Yorker argued that the premise "doesn't make a lot of sense". He praised the "impressive" first act and Jennifer Lawrence, for "project[ing] the kind of strength that Katharine Hepburn had when she was young." Denby found the second act "attenuated and rhythmless" and criticised the "incoherent" finale that "will send the audience scurrying back to the book to find out what’s supposed to be going on".

Accolades

 

Sequels

In July 2012, Lionsgate announced that two films based on the final book in The Hunger Games trilogy, Mockingjay, were scheduled to be released. The first film, The Hunger Games: Mockingjay – Part 1, was released on November 21, 2014 while the second film, The Hunger Games: Mockingjay – Part 2'', was released on November 20, 2015. Principal photography on the two-part film began on September 23, 2013, in Atlanta and concluded on June 20, 2014, in Berlin, Germany.

References

External links

 
 
 

2013 films
2013 action films
2013 science fiction films
2010s survival films
Teen action films
American science fiction action films
American science fiction drama films
American science fiction thriller films
American survival films
Films about teenagers
2
2010s English-language films
American sequel films
American dystopian films
Films scored by James Newton Howard
Films directed by Francis Lawrence
Films set in North America
Films shot in Atlanta
Films shot in Georgia (U.S. state)
Films shot in Hawaii
Films shot in New Jersey
IMAX films
Lionsgate films
Jungle adventure films
Teen adventure films
Films with screenplays by Michael Arndt
Films with screenplays by Simon Beaufoy
2013 drama films
Films produced by Jon Kilik
2010s American films